Pascu may refer to:

Persons

 Ana Derșidan-Ene-Pascu (born 1944), Romanian fencer and sport leader
 Ioan Mircea Pașcu (born 1949), Romanian politician
 Bianca Pascu (born 1988), a Romanian sabre fencer
 Pascu (footballer) (born 2000), Spanish footballer

Places
 Pascu, a tributary of the river Harțagu in Romania

Romanian-language surnames